G.K.C. Reddy is an Indian politician. As of 2014 he served as general secretary of the Karnataka state unit of the Janata Dal (United).

JD(U) fielded Reddy as its candidate for the Chikballapur Lok Sabha seat in 2014 Indian general election.

Bibliography

References

Living people
Janata Dal (United) politicians
Candidates in the 2014 Indian general election
Year of birth missing (living people)